Thredling was a hundred of Suffolk, and at just under  the smallest of Suffolk's 21 hundreds.

The five parishes of Thredling fall into the Deanery of Claydon, the Archdeaconry of Suffolk, and the Diocese of Norwich. The hundred was bounded by Loes, Carlford, Hoxne, Hartismere and Bosmere and Claydon. The River Deben has its source here.

The origin of the hundred's name is not known, though one theory derives it from "Thrythhild", known to be a female first name of the Saxon era.

Parishes

Thredling Hundred consisted of the following 5 parishes:

References

Hundreds of Suffolk